The 1976 San Francisco 49ers season was the franchise's 27th season in the National Football League and their 31st overall.  The team had a new head coach in Monte Clark, who previously was an assistant coach of the Miami Dolphins, to replace Dick Nolan. They began the season with the goal of improving on their previous output of 5–9. They were able to do so, starting the season 6–1; however, after a four-game losing streak, they finished 8–6 and missed the playoffs. This would be the first, and only, season for Clark as head coach. He was let go during the 1977 off-season.

On April 5, 1976, the 49ers traded for former Heisman Trophy winner Jim Plunkett. The 49ers gave the New England Patriots their first round pick in the 1976 NFL Draft, the Houston Oilers first round pick in the 1976 Draft, the 49ers first and second round picks in the 1977 NFL Draft, and quarterback Tom Owen.

Offseason

NFL Draft

Roster

Schedule

Standings

References

San Francisco 49ers seasons
San Francisco 49ers
1976 in San Francisco
San